Harry Winkler may refer to:

 Harry Winkler (handballer) (born 1945), American Olympic handballer
 Harry Winkler (writer), American sitcom writer

See also
 Henry Winkler (disambiguation)
Harold Winkler (disambiguation)